Nelson Miango Mudile (born 26 July 1997), commonly known as Mona, is an Angolan footballer who currently plays as a defender for Primeiro de Agosto.

In July 2020, Mona was announced to return to C.D. Primeiro de Agosto.

Career statistics

Club

Notes

International

References

External links
 

1997 births
Living people
Angolan footballers
Angola international footballers
Association football defenders
C.D. Primeiro de Agosto players
C.R. Caála players
People from Luanda